In 2009, the Anti-Land Invasion Unit was created by the City of Cape Town in an effort to stop people from illegally attempting to occupy land. In 2011 the City stated that the unit demolished about 300 shacks each month. The Anti-Land Invasions Unit is the biggest unit in the City's law enforcement operation.

Unlawful actions by the Unit

When the unit was founded its director, stated that:

However, according to Sheldon Magardie of Lawyers for Human Rights the unit "is acting unlawfully". According to Magardie:

In May 2013 an article in The Daily Maverick claimed that the unit had acting illegally by evicting people from the Marikana Land Occupation without a court order and that City officials were justifying this in terms of a non-exist law and by lying about shacks that the unit had demolished being unoccupied. Constitutional law expert Pierre de Vos later wrote that these evictions were "Brutal, inhumane, and totally unlawful"

Public criticism

Allegations of both violence and theft have been made against the unit by grassroots activists and in the media. It May 2013 it was reported that the unit demolished a pre-school in Langa under questionable circumstances. The People's Assembly has called for the unit to be disbanded.

Notes and references

Cape Town
Housing in South Africa
Law enforcement in South Africa